Llangynllo railway station is a countryside stop in Powys about 5 miles west of Knighton, on the Heart of Wales Line. The station is located 1.4 miles north of Llangunllo village (also known as Llangynllo), at road level beside two houses on a minor rural road off the B4356 road.

Services
All trains serving the station are operated by Transport for Wales. There are four trains a day in each direction from Monday to Saturday and a fifth morning service to Shrewsbury for commuters on weekdays; two services call on Sundays.

This is a request stop, where passengers have to signal to the driver to board or alight from the train. The highest point on the line (about 980 ft (299 m) above sea level) is a short distance to the north of the station, near to the southern portal of the 647 yd (592 m) long Llangynllo tunnel.

Facilities
The station is unstaffed and has no ticketing provision, so all tickets must be purchased before travel or on the train. It has been fitted with a CIS display, payphone and customer help point in addition to the standard timetable poster board and waiting shelter.  The platform is low, which has caused access issues for passengers in the past (a set of wooden steps was required to join or alight from modern stock) but an easy access ramp has since been fitted to help passengers when joining or leaving trains. A disused platform is still visible opposite the active one, as a passing loop was located here until the early 1960s.

Places of interest 
At Llangunllo nearby are the Olgliniau Cynllo, the knee prints of St Cynllo at prayer. These are examples of a petrosomatoglyph.

References

Further reading

External links 

Railway stations in Powys
DfT Category F2 stations
Former London and North Western Railway stations
Railway stations in Great Britain opened in 1865
Heart of Wales Line
Railway stations served by Transport for Wales Rail
Railway request stops in Great Britain